Krzysztof Kamiński (born 11 September 1963) is a Polish judoka. He competed in the men's half-middleweight event at the 1992 Summer Olympics.

References

1963 births
Living people
Polish male judoka
Olympic judoka of Poland
Judoka at the 1992 Summer Olympics
Sportspeople from Gdańsk